Aeroflot Flight 4225 was a Tupolev Tu-154B-2 on a scheduled domestic passenger flight from Alma-Ata Airport (now Almaty) to Simferopol Airport on 8 July 1980. The aircraft had reached an altitude of no more than 500 feet when the airspeed suddenly dropped because of thermal currents it encountered during the climb out. To date, it remains the deadliest aviation accident in Kazakhstan.

Accident
At the time of the accident, Alma-Ata was experiencing a heat wave. It was around 00:39 and Flight 4225 took off from Alma-Ata Airport in Soviet Kazakhstan. Only a few seconds after take off, the flight reached . The weather was not on the flight's side; the plane reached a zone of hot air and then the Soviet aircraft's airspeed dramatically dropped and the plane was caught in a big downdraft. The Tupolev stalled and plummeted, nose down, into a farm near the suburbs of Alma-Ata. It slid into a ravine, caught fire and disintegrated, killing everyone on board.

Investigation
The Soviet aviation board concluded that the crash was caused by windshear which took place while the aircraft was near its maximum takeoff weight for the local conditions which included mountains.

See also
 Aeroflot accidents and incidents in the 1980s

References

External links
 Archive copy of Sarasota Herald-Tribune Soviet Jetliner Crashes; At Least 163 are Killed
 Archive of The Bulletin from 17 July 1980 163 reported dead in Soviet jet crash

Airliner accidents and incidents caused by weather
Aviation accidents and incidents in 1980
Accidents and incidents involving the Tupolev Tu-154
Airliner accidents and incidents caused by microbursts
4227
Aviation accidents and incidents in Kazakhstan
Aviation accidents and incidents in the Soviet Union
1980 in the Soviet Union
July 1980 events in Asia
Aviation accidents and incidents caused by loss of control